The Comoros cuckooshrike (Ceblepyris cucullatus) is a species of bird in the family Campephagidae. It is sometimes considered a subspecies of the Madagascar cuckooshrike.

It is endemic to the Comoros.
Its natural habitats are subtropical or tropical dry forest and subtropical or tropical moist lowland forest.

References

Comoros cuckooshrike
Birds of the Comoros
Comoros cuckooshrike